Fools Dance were an English rock band active from 1983–1987, chiefly noted for their connection to The Cure.

History
Fools Dance was formed in Horley, Surrey in 1983 under the name 'The Cry' and consisted of Ian Fuller on vocals, Stuart Curran on guitar, Simon Gallup on bass guitar, Tot on drums, and Matthieu Hartley on keyboards. Shortly after playing their first and only gig as The Cry at the Covent Garden Rock Garden on 19 April 1983, Ian and Tot left. Over the next few months, the band recruited vocalist Gary Biddles and went through a succession of drummers, using drum machines when they had none. Eventually, the group changed their name to 'Fools Can Dance' but shortly after found themselves reduced to a trio once again following the departure of Matthieu Hartley. After performing just one gig under the moniker 'Fools Can Dance', they shortened it to simply 'Fools Dance' and recruited saxophonist Ron Howe and drummer Pete Gardner.

Despite Gallup's prior involvement with The Cure, Fools Dance ultimately had more of a following in the Low Countries than they did in their native UK, making it difficult to find the time to record a full-length album. Although the group began recording some songs at RMS Studios in London, Gallup ultimately left the group to rejoin The Cure, a move that ultimately hindered any of these tracks from seeing the light of day until after Fools Dance had disbanded due to Gallup's departure. Eventually, by the end of 1985, Fools Dance's self-titled debut EP was released on the Dutch label Universe Productions four months after The Cure's sixth studio album The Head on the Door, which featured a guest appearance by Ron Howe on the song "A Night Like This".

In 1987, Gary Biddles briefly reformed Fools Dance under a new lineup that included guitarist Campbell McKellar, The Stranglers bassist Jean-Jacques Burnel, and Roxy Music drummer Paul Thompson, who had previously been in the group when they first formed as The Cry. They recorded one song and single, "They'll Never Know", but this would be the final release by Fools Dance. Biddles went on to form the band Presence with Lol Tolhurst and Michael Dempsey.

Line-up

The Cry
Stuart Curran – guitar
Simon Gallup – bass guitar
Paul Thompson – drums
Matthieu Hartley – keyboards
Ian Fuller – vocals

Fools Dance
Gary Biddles – vocals
Stuart Curran – guitar
Simon Gallup – bass guitar, lead vocals (on track 4 of They'll Never Know)
Pete Gardner – drums
Ron Howe – saxophone
J.J. Burnel – bass guitar (on track 1 of They'll Never Know)
Campbell MacKellar – guitar (on track 1 of They'll Never Know)
Paul Thompson – drums (on track 1 of They'll Never Know)
Mark Wilson – bass guitar (during short-lived relaunch in the late 1980s)

Discography

Unreleased songs
"Old Door"
"Wonderful Weekend"
"Sin"
"Turn Me Back to Animal"
"Spinning Around"
"The Burn"
"Remembrance Day"
"Where Do You Sleep"
"Snakeskin World"
"Bowdiddly Song"
"Turning Back"
"Tapestry"
"Canaries Out"

References

External links
Fools Dance at picturesofyou.us
Lyrics

English new wave musical groups
English rock music groups
Musical groups established in 1983
1983 establishments in England